This is an incomplete list of caves in Canada. Most notable caves are in western Canada and in parts of southern Ontario where limestone predominates.

See also 
 List of caves
 Speleology

References

 *
Canada
Caves
Caves